Smetanin is a Russian masculine surname. Its feminine counterpart is Smetanina. It may refer to
Aleksei Smetanin (born 1981), Russian football player
Andrei Smetanin (born 1969), Russian football player
Maxim Smetanin (born 1974), Kyrgyzstani triple jumper
Michael Smetanin, Australian composer
Vladimir Smetanin (born 1937), Russian weightlifter 
Raisa Smetanina (born 1952), Russian cross-country skier

See also
Smetana

Russian-language surnames